Mastrus ridens is a species of ichneumon wasp. It was discovered in Kazakhstan in the 1990s, but it was not described as a distinct species from the similar M. ridibundus until 2010. This species is of interest as a potential biological control agent of the codling moth.

References

Ichneumonidae